Ubstadt-Weiher is a municipality in northern Karlsruhe district in Baden-Württemberg, Germany. It is located on Bertha Benz Memorial Route.

The four villages that make up the municipality are (in order of size): Ubstadt, Weiher, Zeutern, and Stettfeld. The area in between and around these villages is numbered with grape vineyards. There are many wineries found in these villages.

References

External links
 Official Website
 Bertha Benz Memorial Route 

Karlsruhe (district)